

Single digit outputs

Teams
National Football League records and achievements